His Master's Voice is a 2001 Spanish crime thriller film directed and written by Emilio Martínez Lázaro which stars Eduard Fernández, Silvia Abascal, Joaquim de Almeida, and Imanol Arias.

Plot 
The plot is set in 1980 in Bilbao. It follows Charli, a former ETA member and football player now working as chauffeur and bodyguard for shady businessman Oliveira and having a casual relationship with substance addict Katy. After an ETA lorry bomb attack in the wake of Oliveira's refusal to bow to the ETA extortion racket, Charli is tasked to protect Oliveira's daughter Marta, having sex and then starting to fall romantically for her.

Cast

Production 
A Lolafilms (Andrés Vicente Gómez) production, the film had the participation of TVE.

Release 
Distributed by Lolafilms Distribución, the film was theatrically released in Spain in May 2001.

Reception 
Jonathan Holland of Variety deemed the film to be "an intelligent, upbeat thriller that welds an invented storyline onto a factual background" and "manages to suggest the moral and political complexity of the subject without sensationalizing it".

Ángel Fernández-Santos of El País considered that the film is, above all, "an act of maturity and solvency, a highly professional work that has led to the elaboration of an admirably measured thriller".

See also 
 List of Spanish films of 2001

References 

Films directed by Emilio Martínez Lázaro
2001 thriller films
2000s Spanish films
2000s Spanish-language films
Spanish crime thriller films
Films set in 1980
Films set in the Basque County
Films about ETA (separatist group)
LolaFilms films
Films about the Spanish Transition